A cosmological horizon is a measure of the distance from which one could possibly retrieve information. This observable constraint is due to various properties of general relativity, the expanding universe, and the physics of Big Bang cosmology. Cosmological horizons set the size and scale of the observable universe. This article explains a number of these horizons.

Particle horizon

The particle horizon (also called the cosmological horizon, the comoving horizon, or the cosmic light horizon) is the maximum distance from which light from particles could have traveled to the observer in the age of the universe. It represents the boundary between the observable and the unobservable regions of the universe, so its distance at the present epoch defines the size of the observable universe. Due to the expansion of the universe, it is not simply the age of the universe times the speed of light, as in the Hubble horizon, but rather the speed of light multiplied by the conformal time. The existence, properties, and significance of a cosmological horizon depend on the particular cosmological model.

In terms of comoving distance, the particle horizon is equal to the conformal time that has passed since the Big Bang, times the speed of light. In general, the conformal time at a certain time is given in terms of the scale factor  by,

or
.

The particle horizon is the boundary between two regions at a point at a given time: one region defined by events that have already been observed by an observer, and the other by events which cannot be observed at that time. It represents the furthest distance from which we can retrieve information from the past, and so defines the observable universe.

Hubble horizon

Hubble radius, Hubble sphere (not to be confused with a Hubble bubble), Hubble volume, or Hubble horizon is a conceptual horizon defining the boundary between particles that are moving slower and faster than the speed of light relative to an observer at one given time. Note that this does not mean the particle is unobservable; the light from the past is reaching and will continue to reach the observer for a while. Also, more importantly, in the current expansion models, light emitted from the Hubble radius will reach us in a finite amount of time. It is a common misconception that light from the Hubble radius can never reach us. In models assuming decreasing  with time (some cases of Friedmann universe), while particles on the Hubble radius recede from us with the speed of light, the Hubble radius gets larger over time, so light emitted towards us from a particle on the Hubble radius will be inside the Hubble radius some time later. In such models, only light emitted from the cosmic event horizon or further will never reach us in a finite amount of time.

The Hubble velocity of an object is given by Hubble's law,

.

Replacing  with speed of light  and solving for proper distance  we obtain the radius of Hubble sphere as

.

In an ever-accelerating universe, if two particles are separated by a distance greater than the Hubble radius, they cannot talk to each other from now on (as they are now, not as they have been in the past), However, if they are outside of each other's particle horizon, they could have never communicated. Depending on the form of expansion of the universe, they may be able to exchange information in the future. Today,

,

yielding a Hubble horizon of some 4.1 gigaparsecs. This horizon is not really a physical size, but it is often used as useful length scale as most physical sizes in cosmology can be written in terms of those factors.

One can also define a comoving Hubble horizon by simply dividing the Hubble radius by the scale factor

.

Event horizon

The particle horizon differs from the cosmic event horizon, in that the particle horizon represents the largest comoving distance from which light could have reached the observer by a specific time, while the cosmic event horizon is the largest comoving distance from which light emitted now can ever reach the observer in the future.

In general, the proper distance to the event horizon at time  is given by

where  is the time-coordinate of the end of the universe, which would be infinite in the case of a universe that expands forever.

For our case, assuming that dark energy is due to a cosmological constant Λ, there will be a minimum Hubble parameter He and a maximum horizon de which is often referred to as the only particle horizon:
 Gly.

Future horizon
This sets a limit on the farthest distance that we can possibly see as measured in units of proper distance today. Or, more precisely, there are events that are spatially separated for a certain frame of reference happening simultaneously with the event occurring right now for which no signal will ever reach us, even though we can observe events that occurred at the same location in space that happened in the distant past. While we will continue to receive signals from this location in space, even if we wait an infinite amount of time, a signal that left from that location today will never reach us. Additionally, the signals coming from that location will have less and less energy and be less and less frequent until the location, for all practical purposes, becomes unobservable. In a universe that is dominated by dark energy which is undergoing an exponential expansion of the scale factor, all objects that are gravitationally unbound with respect to the Milky Way will become unobservable, in a futuristic version of Kapteyn's universe.

Practical horizons
While not technically "horizons" in the sense of an impossibility for observations due to relativity or cosmological solutions, there are practical horizons which include the optical horizon, set at the surface of last scattering. This is the farthest distance that any photon can freely stream. Similarly, there is a "neutrino horizon" set for the farthest distance a neutrino can freely stream and a gravitational wave horizon at the farthest distance that gravitational waves can freely stream. The latter is predicted to be a direct probe of the end of cosmic inflation.

See also 

 Killing horizon

References

External links
 

Physical cosmology